The Keighley Festival is a festival held in the town of Keighley, West Yorkshire, England during a two-week period in June or July each year. The festival consists of various local events and Galas. The  aim is to incorporate local talent, hobbies, and pastimes to illustrate diversity and local community spirit.

History
The Keighley Festival was started in 1986, and has had various names over the years. Until 2005 it was called the Keighley Festivals. The Keighley Festival now amalgamates the "Festival of Learning" and the "Keighley Festivals" and is known as the Keighley Festival.

External links
 https://web.archive.org/web/20060708063106/http://www.keighleyfestival.info/ - official web page

The official website page is linked here.

Festivals in West Yorkshire
Arts festivals in England
Keighley